South Fork Animas River is a tributary of the Animas River in San Juan County, Colorado. It flows from a source near Tower Mountain to a confluence with the Animas River.

See also
List of rivers of Colorado

References

Rivers of Colorado
Rivers of San Juan County, Colorado
Tributaries of the Colorado River in Colorado